Justice Marshall may refer to:

United States Supreme Court 
 John Marshall (1755–1835), chief justice of the United States Supreme Court
 Thurgood Marshall (1908–1993), associate justice of the United States Supreme Court
 John Marshall Harlan (1833–1911), associate justice of the United States Supreme Court
 John Marshall Harlan II (1899–1971), associate justice of the United States Supreme Court

Other courts 
 Carrington T. Marshall (1869–1958), chief justice of the Ohio Supreme Court
 John Marshall (Kansas judge) (1858–1931), justice of the Kansas Supreme Court from 1915 to 1931
 Margaret H. Marshall (born 1944), 23rd chief justice of the Massachusetts Supreme Judicial Court
 Roujet D. Marshall (1847–1922), associate justice of the Wisconsin Supreme Court
 Thomas O. Marshall, Jr, chief justice of the Supreme Court of Georgia
 William Champe Marshall, judge of the Supreme Court of Missouri, (the equivalent of an associate justice in other states)

See also
Judge Marshall (disambiguation)